Food drunkenness is the physiological state of a person after consuming large amounts of food.

Historical meaning
The use of the word "drunk" to signify being overcome by substances other than alcohol is long-established, e.g. drunk with opium (1585), or with tobacco (1698).

In October 1905, Thomas Edison (then 58 years old) declared that "the country is food drunk.... the people eat too much and sleep too much, and don't work enough". Citing the theories of Louis Cornaro (born 1464), Edison explained how an assistant had been so affected by experiments with X-rays that "doctors had to amputate one limb after another.... and finally he died". Thomas Edison also stated that by reducing his food intake to  a day, at the end of two months he weighed just as much as when he began, exactly .

The phrase was echoed by Dr J E Rullfson of Toledo after fasting for sixty days from January 5, 1907. He holds that the entire human race is food drunk, saying "the dinner eaten by Napoleon just before the Battle of Leipzig proved so indigestible that the monarch's brain was clouded and as a result the battle was lost and a pie which King Philip failed to digest caused the revolt of the Netherlands."

State of being food drunk

When people overeat, their bodies have the tendency to chemically change, including metabolic shifts.  There are also electrolyte imbalances due to the process of digestion that occur once the massive amounts of food have been deposited into the body. This can also cause a feeling of depression, emotional attachment to food, fatigue, and also boredom. This is hypothesized to be partially due to dopamine and endorphin release after food consumption (especially spicy foods).

See also
 Postprandial somnolence

References

Physiology
Eating behaviors of humans